The 1987–88 Oregon State Beavers men's basketball team represented Oregon State University in Corvallis, Oregon in the 1987–88 season.

Led by Ralph Miller, in his 18th season at Oregon State, the Beavers would finish with a record of 20–11 (12–6 Pac-10). The Beavers were invited to the NCAA tournament, where they lost in the first round to Louisville.

Roster

Schedule and results

|-
!colspan=12 style=| Non-conference regular season

|-
!colspan=12 style=| Pac-10 regular season

|-
!colspan=12 style=|Pacific-10 tournament

|-
!colspan=12 style=|NCAA tournament

Sources

References

Oregon State
Oregon State Beavers men's basketball seasons
Oregon State
Oregon State
Oregon State